The European VLBI Network (EVN) is a network of radio telescopes located primarily in Europe and Asia, with additional antennas in South Africa and Puerto Rico, which performs very high angular resolution observations of cosmic radio sources using very-long-baseline interferometry (VLBI). The EVN is the most sensitive VLBI array in the world, and the only one capable of real-time observations. The Joint Institute for VLBI ERIC (JIVE) acts as the central organisation in the EVN, providing both scientific user support and a correlator facility. Very Long Baseline Interferometry (VLBI) achieves ultra-high angular resolution and is a multi-disciplinary technique used in astronomy, geodesy and astrometry.

The EVN operates an open-sky policy, allowing anyone to propose an observation using the network

EVN Telescopes 
The EVN network comprises 22 telescope facilities:

Additionally the EVN often links with the UK-based 7-element Jodrell Bank MERLIN interferometer. It can also be connected to the US Very Long Baseline Array (VLBA), achieving a global VLBI, obtaining sub-milliarcsecond resolution at frequencies higher than 5 GHz.

e-EVN 
Since 2004, the EVN has started to be linked together using international fibre optic networks, through a technique known as e-VLBI. The EXPReS project was designed to connect telescopes at Gigabit per second links via their National Research Networks and the Pan-European research network GÉANT2, and make the first astronomical experiments using this new technique. This allows researchers to take advantage of the e-EVN's Targets of Opportunity for conducting follow-on observations of transient events such as X-ray binary flares, supernova explosions and gamma-ray bursts.

EXPReS's objectives are to connect up to 16 of the world's most sensitive radio telescopes on six continents to the central data processor of the European VLBI Network at the Joint Institute for VLBI ERIC (JIVE). Specific activities involve securing "last-mile connections" and upgrading existing connections to the telescopes, updating the correlator to process up to 16 data streams at 1 Gbit/s each in real time and research possibilities for distributed computing to replace the centralized data processor.

History 
The EVN was formed in 1980 by a consortium of five of the major radio astronomy institutes in Europe (the European Consortium for VLBI). Since 1980, the EVN and the Consortium has grown to include many institutes with numerous radio telescopes in several western European countries as well as associated institutes with telescopes in Russia, Ukraine, China and South Africa. Proposals for an additional telescope in Spain are under consideration.

Observations using the EVN have contributed to scientific research on Fast Radio Bursts (FRBs), gravitational lensing, and supermassive black holes.

See also 
 Northern Extended Millimeter Array

References

External links 

The European VLBI Network on the internet
Joint Institute for VLBI ERIC on the internet

Astronomy in Europe
Interferometric telescopes
Radio telescopes